Sylvanelater is a genus of click beetles in the family Elateridae. There are at least four described species in Sylvanelater.

Species
These four species belong to the genus Sylvanelater:
 Sylvanelater cylindriformis (Herbst, 1806) g b
 Sylvanelater furtivus (LeConte, 1853) g b
 Sylvanelater limoniiformis (Horn, 1871) g
 Sylvanelater mendax (LeConte, 1853) g b
Data sources: i = ITIS, c = Catalogue of Life, g = GBIF, b = Bugguide.net

References

Further reading

External links

 

Elateridae